Kabeš is a Czech surname. Notable people with the surname include: 

Jiří Kabeš (born 1946), Czech rock singer, violist, violinist, guitarist, and songwriter
Petr Kabeš (1941–2005), Czech poet

See also
Ian Kabes

Czech-language surnames